The 1954 Soviet Chess Championship was the 21st edition of USSR Chess Championship. Held from 7 January to 7 February 1954 in Kiev. The tournament was won by Yuri Averbakh. The final were preceded semifinals events at Moscow, Leningrad, Rostov and Vilnius.

Table and results

References 

USSR Chess Championships
Championship
Chess
1954 in chess
Chess